Hasya Drori (1899 – 3 June 1976) was an Israeli politician who served as a member of the Knesset for Mapai between 1949 and 1951.

Biography
Drori was born Hasya Kupfermintz in Gomel in the Mogilev Governorate of the Russian Empire (now in Belarus), and was a member of the Youth of Zion and HeHalutz youth groups. She made aliyah to Mandatory Palestine in 1922, and joined Gdud HaAvoda. In 1924 she was amongst the founders of moshav Kfar Yehezkel. She became a member of the Working Mothers Organisation, and also joined Mapai. In 1937 she travelled to the United States as an emissary for Mapai and the Histadrut trade union.

In 1949 she was elected to the first Knesset on the Mapai list and was known as a formidable feminist. However, she lost her seat in elections two years later. She later worked in immigrant absorption.

References

External links

1899 births
1976 deaths
People from Gomel
People from Gomelsky Uyezd
Jews from the Russian Empire
Belarusian Jews
Soviet Jews
Soviet emigrants to Mandatory Palestine
Jews in Mandatory Palestine
Israeli people of Belarusian-Jewish descent
Mapai politicians
Members of the 1st Knesset (1949–1951)
Women members of the Knesset
Israeli trade unionists
Israeli feminists
Jewish feminists
20th-century Israeli women politicians
Jewish women politicians